The Massingham Affair is a 1962 crime detective novel by the British writer Edward Grierson. Grierson based on the story on a real-life case that took place in Edlingham. in the late nineteenth century.

Synopsis
Many years before an elderly vicar and his daughter were the victims of a violent robbery. Two local men were arrested and sentenced to life imprisonment for the crime. Now, Justin Derry, working as a solicitor in the village decides to reopen the case and exonerate the accused, despite the hostility that ensues from the villagers.

TV adaptation
In 1964 it was made into a television series of the same title, broadcast on BBC Two. The cast included Lyndon Brook, Andrew Keir, Eileen Atkins and Renny Lister.

References

Bibliography
Baskin, Ellen. Serials on British Television, 1950-1994. Scolar Press, 1996.
 Reilly, John M. Twentieth Century Crime & Mystery Writers. Springer, 2015.
 White, Terry. Justice Denoted: The Legal Thriller in American, British, and Continental Courtroom Literature. Praeger, 2003.

1962 British novels
Novels by Edward Grierson
British crime novels
British detective novels
Chatto & Windus books
Novels set in Northumberland
British novels adapted into television shows